Lacourbe may refer to:

 Lacourbe (city), a place near Ouled-Agla in Algeria, possible site of Ancient Equizetum
 Persons 
 Roland Lacourbe, French film critic 
 (fiction) Lieutenant Lacourbe, a friend of d'Hubert Maurice Colbourne as Feraud's second in The Duellists

See also 
 La Courbe, commune